Wesley Morgan may refer to:

Wes Morgan, Jamaican footballer
Wesley Morgan (actor), Canadian actor and model
C. Wesley Morgan, American businessman and politician